Carmen Navarro Pedrosa (1941/1942 – June 8, 2022) was a Filipino journalist best known for a series of biographical books on the life of former Philippine First Lady Imelda Marcos, and for her role in the overseas resistance against the Marcos dictatorship after she went into exile in London during the Marcos administration.

She was also the mother of journalist and news anchor Veronica Pedrosa.

References

External links 
 Resume

1940s births
2022 deaths
Year of birth missing
Place of birth missing
Filipino journalists
Filipino women journalists
Women biographers
20th-century biographers
20th-century women writers
Recipients of the Presidential Medal of Merit (Philippines)